Billie Joe Armstrong (born February 17, 1972) is an American musician, singer and songwriter who is the lead vocalist, guitarist, and primary songwriter of the rock band Green Day, which he co-founded with Mike Dirnt in 1987. He is also a guitarist and vocalist for the punk rock band Pinhead Gunpowder, and provides lead vocals for Green Day's side projects Foxboro Hot Tubs, The Network, The Longshot and The Coverups. Armstrong has been considered by critics as one of the greatest punk rock guitarists of all time.

Armstrong developed an interest in music at a young age, and recorded his first song at the age of five. He met Dirnt while attending elementary school, and the two instantly bonded over their mutual interest in music, forming the band Sweet Children when the two were 14 years old. The band later changed its name to Green Day. Armstrong has also pursued musical projects including numerous collaborations with other musicians. In 1997, to coincide with the release of Nimrod, he founded Adeline Records to help support other bands, signing acts such as The Frustrators, AFI, and Dillinger Four. The record company later shut down in August 2017.

Early life
Billie Joe Armstrong was born in Oakland, California, on February 17, 1972, the youngest of six children of Ollie Jackson (born 1932) and Andrew Marsicano Armstrong (1928–1982). He was raised in Rodeo, California. His father, a jazz musician and truck driver for Safeway, died of esophageal cancer on September 10, 1982, when Armstrong was 10 years old. The song "Wake Me Up When September Ends" is a memorial to his father. Armstrong has three older sisters named Marci, Hollie, and Anna, and two older brothers named David and Alan. His mother worked as a waitress at Rod's Hickory Pit in El Cerrito, California, where he and Mike Dirnt would play their first gig in 1987. His great-great-grandparents Pietro Marsicano and Teresa Nigro were Italian immigrants from Viggiano who settled in Boston until 1869, when they moved to Berkeley, California.

Armstrong attended Hillcrest Elementary School in Rodeo, where a teacher encouraged him to record a song titled "Look for Love" at the age of five on the Bay Area label Fiat Records. After his father died, his mother married a man whom her children disliked, which resulted in Armstrong's further retreat into music. At the age of 10, he met Dirnt in the school cafeteria, and they immediately bonded over their love of music. He became interested in punk rock after being introduced to the genre by his brothers. He has also cited Van Halen, Ramones, The Replacements and Hüsker Dü as major musical influences. His first concert ever watched was Van Halen in 1984. Along with Hillcrest Elementary, Armstrong attended Carquinez Middle School and John Swett High School, both in Crockett, California, and later transferred to Pinole Valley High School in Pinole, California. On his 18th birthday, he dropped out to pursue a musical career.

Career
In 1987, aged 15, Armstrong formed a band called Sweet Children with his childhood friend Mike Dirnt. In the beginning, Armstrong and Dirnt both played guitar, with Raj Punjabi on drums and Sean Hughes on bass. Punjabi was later replaced on drums by John Kiffmeyer, also known as Al Sobrante. After a few performances, Hughes left the band in 1988; Dirnt then began playing bass and they became a three-piece band. They changed their name to Green Day in April 1989, choosing the name because of their fondness for marijuana.

In 1989, Green Day released their debut EP 1,000 Hours through Lookout! Records. They recorded their debut studio album 39/Smooth and the extended play Slappy in 1990, which were later combined with 1,000 Hours into the compilation 1,039/Smoothed Out Slappy Hours in 1991.

In 1990, Armstrong provided lead guitar and backing vocals on three songs for The Lookouts' final EP IV, which featured Tré Cool on drums. Tré became Green Day's drummer in late 1990 after Sobrante left in order to go to college. Cool made his debut on Green Day's second album, Kerplunk (1991).

In 1991, Armstrong joined the band Pinhead Gunpowder, consisting of bassist Bill Schneider, drummer Aaron Cometbus, and fellow vocalist/guitarist Sarah Kirsch. Kirsch left the group in 1992, and was replaced by Jason White. The group has released several extended plays and albums from 1991 to the present, and performs live shows on an intermittent basis.

In 1993, Armstrong played live several times with California punk band Rancid. Rancid's lead singer, Tim Armstrong, asked Billie Joe Armstrong to join his band, but he refused due to his progress with Green Day. However, Billie Joe Armstrong was credited as a co-writer on Rancid's 1993 song, Radio.

With their third LP, Dookie (1994), Green Day broke through into the mainstream, and have remained one of the most popular rock bands of the 1990s and 2000s with over 60 million records sold worldwide. The album was followed by Insomniac (1995), Nimrod (1997), and Warning (2000).

Armstrong collaborated with many artists. He co-wrote the Go-Go's 2001 song "Unforgiven". He has also co-written songs with Penelope Houston ("The Angel and The Jerk" and "New Day"), and sung backing vocals with Melissa Auf der Maur on Ryan Adams' "Do Miss America" (where they acted as the backing band for Iggy Pop on his album Skull Ring ("Private Hell" and "Supermarket"). Armstrong produced an album for the Riverdales. He was part of the Green Day side project the Network from 2003 to 2005, which became active again in 2020. The Network released two albums: 2003's Money Money 2020 and 2020's Money Money 2020 Part II: We Told Ya So!.

Hoping to clear his head and develop new ideas for songs, Armstrong traveled to New York City alone for a few weeks in 2003, renting a small apartment in the East Village of Manhattan. He spent much of this time taking long walks and participating in jam sessions in the basement of Hi-Fi, a bar in Manhattan. However, the friends he made during this time drank too much for his liking, which was the catalyst for Armstrong's return to the Bay Area. After returning home, Armstrong was arrested for driving under the influence on January 5, 2003, and released on $1,200 bail.

In 2004, Green Day debuted American Idiot, their first rock opera. The album has sold more than 15,000,000 copies worldwide, fueled by the hit singles "American Idiot", "Boulevard of Broken Dreams" and "Wake Me Up When September Ends". In 2009, Green Day released 21st Century Breakdown, the band's second rock opera, which was another commercial success. Between these two projects, Armstrong was the lead vocalist of the Green Day side project Foxboro Hot Tubs, who formed in 2007 and have performed intermittent live shows ever since. Foxboro Hot Tubs released one album, Stop Drop and Roll!!!, in 2008.

In 2009, Armstrong formed a band called Rodeo Queens, along with members of Green Day and NYC punk rocker Jesse Malin. They released one song, along with a video, called "Depression Times".

In 2009, American Idiot was adapted into a Broadway musical, also called American Idiot. The musical won two Tony Awards. Armstrong appeared in American Idiot in the role of St. Jimmy for two stints in late 2010 and early 2011.

In 2012, Green Day released a trio of albums: ¡Uno!, ¡Dos!, and ¡Tré!. In 2013, Armstrong appeared on Season 3 of NBC's The Voice as an assistant mentor for Christina Aguilera's team. In 2013, Armstrong and singer-songwriter Norah Jones released the album Foreverly, consisting of covers of songs from The Everly Brothers' album Songs Our Daddy Taught Us. The first single from the album, "Long Time Gone", was released on October 23.

2012 substance abuse
On September 21, 2012, during a Green Day performance at Las Vegas' iHeartRadio Music Festival, Armstrong became agitated onstage and stopped the band's set midway through their performance of the 1994 hit song "Basket Case". In an expletive-filled rant, Armstrong criticized the event's promoters for allegedly cutting short the band's performance, before smashing his guitar and storming off stage. The band later issued a statement apologizing for the incident and clarifying that their set had not actually been cut short. The incident occurred just four days prior to the release of Green Day's ninth studio album, ¡Uno!

Two days after the incident at the iHeartRadio Music Festival, Green Day announced that Armstrong was seeking treatment for an unspecified substance abuse problem. As a result, scheduled appearances on Jimmy Kimmel Live and The Ellen DeGeneres Show were canceled. According to Claudia Suarez Wright, Tre Cool's ex-wife and the mother of Armstrong's godson, Armstrong had been drinking heavily in Las Vegas prior to the iHeartRadio Music Festival, following approximately one year of sobriety.

Armstrong gave an interview to Rolling Stone in March 2013 in which he said that he had "been trying to get sober since 1997, right around Nimrod". He discussed how, during the 21st Century Breakdown tour of 2009–2010, "There were meltdowns on that tour that were huge". Armstrong detailed his addiction, in particular how it had escalated in the months prior to the release of the ¡Uno!, ¡Dos!, and ¡Tre! albums and the performance at iHeartRadio, stating that during the band's 2011 summer tour of Europe, "I was at my pill-taking height at that time, medicating the shit out of myself". Armstrong gave details of a gig at Irving Plaza in New York just over a week before the iHeartRadio incident, in which he "Threw back four or five beers before we went on and probably had four or five when we played. Then I drank my body weight in alcohol after that. I ended up hungover on the West Side Highway, laying in a little park."

Green Day canceled all remaining concert dates for 2012 and early 2013 as Armstrong continued dealing with his personal problems. In late December 2012, the band announced they would return to touring at the end of March 2013. Armstrong later said that the substances he had been abusing were alcohol and prescription pills for anxiety and insomnia.

2013 onward

Armstrong also collaborated with the comedy hip hop group Lonely Island in their song "I Run NY" from The Wack Album released on June 7, 2013. He starred alongside Leighton Meester in the 2014 film Like Sunday, Like Rain. For his work in the film, Bilie Joe won the Breakout Performance Award at the 2014 Williamsburg Independent Film Festival. Armstrong wrote songs for These Paper Bullets, a rock musical adaptation of Much Ado About Nothing, which premiered at Yale Repertory Theater in March 2014.

In 2014, Armstrong joined The Replacements for a number of shows beginning on April 19 at Coachella. Frontman Paul Westerberg had been suffering with back problems and spent the majority of the gig lying on a sofa while Armstrong helped play his parts. Westerberg referred to Billie Joe as an "expansion of the band". Armstrong joined The Replacements on stage again at the Shaky Knees Music Festival in Atlanta in May.

In November 2014, Armstrong moved with his son Joseph to New York and began working on another acting role, in the film Ordinary World. It was Armstrong's first lead acting role. The film centers on the mid-life crisis of a husband and father who attempts to revisit his punk past, and was released in 2016. It included new songs written and performed by Armstrong. The film got mixed reviews, although Armstrong's own performance was generally praised, with The Village Voice writing that he had "a low-key charm suggesting that, if he desired it, he could get more onscreen gigs in between albums."

In October 2016, Green Day released their album Revolution Radio. In July 2017, Armstrong formed a supergroup with Tim Armstrong of Rancid, named The Armstrongs.

In April 2018, Armstrong formed the rock band The Longshot, and on April 20, the band released their debut studio album Love Is For Losers. Shortly after, Armstrong announced that he and The Longshot would embark on a summer tour. Aside from Armstrong, the band's lineup consists of Kevin Preston and David S. Field of the band Prima Donna on lead guitar and drums, respectively, and longtime Green Day live member Jeff Matika on bass.

In 2019, Armstrong co-wrote and performed the track "Strangers & Thieves" on the album Sunset Kids by Jesse Malin.

In February 2020, Green Day released their latest album, Father of All Motherfuckers.

Instruments

Armstrong's first guitar was a Cherry Red Hohner acoustic, which his father bought for him. He received his first electric guitar, a Fernandes The Revival RST-50 Stratocaster that he named "Blue", when he was ten years old in 1982, the same year his father died. His mother got "Blue" from George Cole, who taught Armstrong to play guitar for 10 years. Armstrong says in a 1995 MTV interview, "Basically, it wasn't like guitar lessons because I never really learned how to read music. So he just taught me how to put my hands on the thing." Cole bought the guitar new from David Margen of the band Santana. Cole installed the Bill Lawrence L500XL Humbucker pickup in the bridge position at an angle similar to Eddie Van Halen's guitar Frankenstrat which caused Armstrong to be very influenced by Van Halen. Armstrong replaced the L500XL with a white Yamaha Pacifica humbucker at Woodstock '94.

Armstrong later reinstalled the Bill Lawrence L500XL pickup before recording Insomniac, and used it for a long time after that, although he switched to a black Seymour Duncan SH-4 JB in 1995. He toured with this guitar from the band's early days and still uses it to this day.

Marc Spitz writes that, "Armstrong fetishized his teacher's guitar, partly because the blue instrument had a sound quality and Van Halen-worthy fluidity he couldn't get from his little red Hohner. He prized it mostly, however, because of his relationship with Cole, another father figure after the death of Andy."

Both middle and neck pickups are disconnected and the pickup selector is locked in the bridge position, this also applies to his backup guitar and "Blue" copies, mainly Fender Stratocaster. "Blue" appears in a number of Green Day music videos such as "Longview", "Welcome to Paradise", "Basket Case", "Geek Stink Breath", "Stuck with Me", "Brain Stew/Jaded", "Hitchin' a Ride" and most recently in "Minority". "Blue" also  appears on the album cover of Insomniac. The "BJ" on Blue stands for Billie Joe, inspired by Stevie Ray Vaughan whose Stratocaster has his own initials, "SRV", on the pickguard.

Today, Armstrong mainly uses Gibson and Fender guitars. Twenty of his Gibson guitars are Les Paul Junior models from the mid- to late-1950s. His Fender collection includes: Stratocaster, Jazzmaster, Telecaster, a Gretsch hollowbody, Rickenbacker 360 and his copies of "Blue" from Fender Custom Shop. Recently he has begun giving away guitars to audience members invited to play on stage with Green Day, usually during the songs "Knowledge" or "Longview". He states that his favorite guitar is a 1956 Gibson Les Paul Junior he calls "Floyd". He bought this guitar in 2000 just before recording the album Warning.

Armstrong also has three of his own Les Paul Junior signature models from Gibson. The first has been in production since 2006 and is modeled closely after "Floyd", Armstrong's original 1956 Les Paul Junior. The second began production in 2012 and is a TV Yellow double-cutaway Junior. Both models include a Gibson "H-90" pickup, exclusive to Armstrong's models. Gibson has also released an extremely limited run of acoustic signature guitars.

He plays several other instruments as well as guitar. He recorded harmonica and mandolin parts on (Nimrod and Warning), piano parts on 21st Century Breakdown, American Idiot: The Original Broadway Cast Recording (2010) and ¡Tré!, and plays drums and bass occasionally.

Personal life

In June 2018, Armstrong was given honorary citizenship of Viggiano, the Italian commune from where his great-great-grandparents hailed, by Viggiano's mayor Amedeo Cicala. Armstrong is a member of the board of directors of Project Chimps, a sanctuary for former research chimpanzees funded in large part by the Humane Society of the United States.

Business ventures
In 1997, Armstrong co-founded Adeline Records, a rock and punk rock record label which had, in recent years, been managed by Pat Magnarella, Green Day's manager. Adeline Records closed in August 2017 following Magnarella's split from Green Day.

In April 2015, Armstrong opened Broken Guitars, a guitar shop in Oakland, California with fellow Pinhead Gunpowder member and longtime Green Day associate, Bill Schneider.

In December 2015, Armstrong and Mike Dirnt launched a coffee company, Oakland Coffee Works. The company sells organic coffee beans and is said to be the first company to use mass-produced compostable bags and pods.

Fashion

Armstrong has been noted for his punk fashion style, which influenced his followers of previous and current generations to the point of being known as a "style icon". He also launched an eye liner with Kat Von D named "Basket Case", which is a cosmetic that he implemented as part of his singing character since his beginnings.

Political views
Armstrong supported Barack Obama during the 2008 and 2012 presidential elections, and Bernie Sanders in the 2016 presidential election. Following Sanders' failure to become the Democratic nominee, Armstrong declared his support for Hillary Clinton. He was critical of Donald Trump during the election and throughout Trump's presidency, calling him a "fascist" and a "puppet of the Illuminati", comparing him to Adolf Hitler, and blaming "uneducated white working-class people" for his rise to power. In a 2017 Rolling Stone interview, he stated that he does not align himself with any political party and described himself as an independent. He again supported Sanders during the 2020 presidential election, later endorsing Joe Biden after Sanders lost the primary. Following the U.S. Supreme Court decision Dobbs v. Jackson Women's Health Organization, Armstrong announced his plans to renounce his United States citizenship.

Relationships and sexuality

Armstrong has identified himself as bisexual, saying in a 1995 interview with The Advocate, "I think I've always been bisexual. I mean, it's something that I've always been interested in. I think people are born bisexual, and it's just that our parents and society kind of veer us off into this feeling of, 'Oh, I can't.' They say it's taboo. It's ingrained in our heads that it's bad, when it's not bad at all. It's a very beautiful thing." In February 2014, he again discussed his bisexuality in a Rolling Stone article about the Green Day album Dookie, which he described as "touch[ing] on bisexuality a lot".

Armstrong met his first serious girlfriend, Arica Pelino, at 924 Gilman Street on his 16th birthday. She became known as the "first official Green Day fan," listening to the first four-track recordings by Armstrong and Sean Hughes, encouraging the band, touring with them and acting as an occasional photographer for them. She inspired many of Green Day's songs, including "Christie Road", which was written about the local railroad tracks where she and Armstrong would sneak out to meet. When Armstrong began living in punk houses and warehouses at the age of seventeen, including the warehouse above a West Oakland brothel which ultimately inspired the song "Welcome to Paradise", she would often stay with him, later saying, "I would stay with him sometimes in these warehouses full of crusty punks." The couple split in late 1991. Arica is the sister of former Green Day touring member Mike Pelino and the sister-in-law of Janna White, who is married to Green Day touring guitarist Jason White.

Shortly after his split with Pelino, Armstrong began dating a woman he has identified only as "Amanda". She produced and distributed her own fan zine and was an "iron-willed" feminist, which enthralled Armstrong. Amanda, however, was unimpressed with Armstrong; though the couple dated for some time, she ultimately left him in 1994 and joined the Peace Corps, leaving him feeling suicidal. Armstrong stated in an interview with Spin about the inspiration behind the Green Day song "Armitage Shanks" in 1995: "It was right before Dookie came out and I was really at odds with myself. I was like, 'Man, do I really want to do this?' A lot of time I was thinking about suicide, how it's so easy to kill yourself, but it's so hard to stay alive. I was in a break-up with my then-girlfriend, a total, raving punk rocker who didn't approve of me being on a major label. She moved down to Ecuador saying she couldn't live in a world with McDonald's and such. It was fucking me up pretty bad." Armstrong has written many songs about Amanda, both during their relationship and afterwards, including "She", "Good Riddance", "Stuart and the Ave", "Sassafras Roots", "Amanda", "She's a Rebel", "Extraordinary Girl", and "Whatsername". The character of Whatsername on the album American Idiot, and in the American Idiot musical, is based on Amanda.

In 1990, Armstrong met Adrienne Nesser (the sister of professional skateboarder Steve Nesser) at one of Green Day's early performances in Minneapolis. They married on July 2, 1994, with Nesser discovering that she was pregnant the day after their wedding. Their first son, Joseph Marciano "Joey" Armstrong, was born on February 28, 1995. Joey went on to play drums in the Oakland-based band SWMRS until accusations of sexual misconduct and coercion were made against him in 2020. Their second son, Jakob Danger Armstrong, was born on September 12, 1998; he is a guitarist and singer-songwriter who released his first material online in 2015 and currently plays with the band Mt. Eddy. In a February 2014 interview with Rolling Stone, Armstrong described his sudden marriage and fatherhood: "I was very impulsive at that time. I think that impulsive behavior was meant to counteract the chaos in my life."

Awards

Discography

Solo releases
Albums
 Foreverly (2013, with Norah Jones)
 No Fun Mondays (2020)

Singles
 "Look for Love" (1977)
 "Long Time Gone" (2013)
 "I Think We're Alone Now" (2020)
 "Manic Monday" (2020)
 "That Thing You Do! (2020)
 "Kids in America" (2020)
 "You Can't Put Your Arms Around a Memory" (2020)
 "Corpus Christi" (2020)
 "War Stories" (2020)
 "Amico" (2020)
 "Not That Way Anymore" (2020)
 "That's Rock 'n' Roll" (2020)
 "Gimme Some Truth" (2020)
 "A New England" (2020)

Green Day

 39/Smooth (1990) – lead vocals, guitar
 Kerplunk! (1991) – lead vocals, guitar, drums on "Dominated Love Slave"
 Dookie (1994) – lead vocals, guitar, percussion on "All by Myself" (hidden track)
 Insomniac (1995) – lead vocals, guitar
 Nimrod (1997) – lead vocals, guitar, harmonica
 Warning (2000) – lead vocals, mandolin, guitar, piano, harmonica
 American Idiot (2004) – lead vocals, guitar, piano
 21st Century Breakdown (2009) – lead vocals, guitar, piano
 American Idiot: The Original Broadway Cast Recording (2010) – vocals, guitar, piano
 ¡Uno! (2012) – lead vocals, guitar
 ¡Dos! (2012) – lead vocals, guitar
 ¡Tré! (2012) – lead vocals, guitar, piano
 Revolution Radio (2016) – lead vocals, guitar, piano
 Father of All Motherfuckers (2020) - lead vocals, guitar

Pinhead Gunpowder
Vocals and guitar on all

 Jump Salty (1994)
 Carry the Banner (1994)
 Goodbye Ellston Avenue (1997)
 Shoot the Moon (EP) (1999) – also production
 Compulsive Disclosure (2003)
 West Side Highway (EP) (2008)

The Network
 Money Money 2020 (2003) – guitar, vocals
 Trans Am (EP) (2020)
 Money Money 2020 Part II: We Told Ya So! (2020) -  lead vocals, lead guitar, backing vocals, drums

Foxboro Hot Tubs
 Stop Drop and Roll!!! (2008) – lead vocals

SWMRS
This Kid. (Demo) (2008) – production
 Goody Two Shoes (EP) (2009) – production
 Broadcast This (EP) (2010) – production
 Regan MacNeil (EP) (2010) – production
 Don't Be a Dick (2011) – production
 Lost at Seventeen (2013) – production
 Swim (EP) (2014) – production

The Boo
 The Boo (EP) (2011) – bass

The Shrives
 Turn Me On (EP) (2015) – bass

The Longshot
The Longshot (EP) (2018) – vocals, guitar, bass, drums
Love Is for Losers (2018) – vocals, guitar, bass, drums
Devil's Kind (Single) (2018) – vocals, guitar, bass, drums
Bullets (Single) (2018) – vocals, guitar, bass, drums
Razor Baby (EP) (2018) – vocals, guitar, bass, drums
Return to Sender (EP) (2018) – vocals, guitar, bass, drums

Filmography

Film

Television

Video games

Stage

See also
List of guitarists

References

External links

 
 
 

1972 births
20th-century American male actors
20th-century American male singers
20th-century American LGBT people
21st-century American male actors
21st-century American male singers
21st-century American LGBT people
21st-century multi-instrumentalists
Adeline Records
Alternative rock guitarists
Alternative rock singers
American alternative rock musicians
American LGBT singers
American LGBT songwriters
American male guitarists
American male musical theatre actors
American male singer-songwriters
American mandolinists
American multi-instrumentalists
American people of Italian descent
American punk rock guitarists
American punk rock singers
American rock songwriters
Bisexual male actors
Bisexual singers
Bisexual songwriters
Grammy Award winners
Green Day members
Guitarists from California
Lead guitarists
LGBT people from California
LGBT producers
Living people
Male actors from Oakland, California
Musicians from Oakland, California
Musicians from the San Francisco Bay Area
New York (state) Independents
People from Rodeo, California
People from the East Village, Manhattan
Pop punk singers
Record producers from California
Singer-songwriters from California
Singer-songwriters from New York (state)
American bisexual writers